Stina Swartling (née von Hofsten; 28 June 1858 – 26 November 1929), was a Swedish writer.

Life and work 
Stina Swartling was born on June 28, 1858, at Valåsen Manor, Karlskoga, Sweden, and was the second of ten children of Bengt and Baroness Lovisa Sofia von Hofsten (née Hamilton af Hageby).

In 1880, Stina von Hofsten married Reinhold Magnus Svartling. The couple settled in Espenäs, Örebro County.

In 1899, Swartling founded a garden school, which she branded as Sweden's first women-only garden school.

Bibliography 

 Om höns, 1906.
 Om sparris och tomater, 1907.
 Om kalkoner, pärlhöns, gäss och ankor, 1908.
 Om jord och gödslingsämnen samt om potatis, 1909.

References 

1858 births
1929 deaths
People from Karlskoga Municipality
Swedish nobility
20th-century Swedish writers
Swedish-language writers
Writers from Karlskoga